Austin City Limits Live at The Moody Theater (ACL Live or Moody Theater) is the theater and studio for Austin City Limits, completed in February 2011 as part of the Block 21 complex.

The Moody Foundation of Galveston granted $2.5 million to KLRU, the largest single gift ever received by the PBS station, to help equip the new home of Austin City Limits on Second Street (Willie Nelson Boulevard) in Downtown Austin, Texas with high-definition production equipment. In recognition, the venue is called Austin City Limits Live at The Moody Theater.

The theater/studio holds 2,750 fans, up from the capacity of 320 at its old space on the University of Texas at Austin campus, and hosts an estimated 100 concerts and 100 private events a year, in addition to the Austin City Limits tapings. KLRU gets 45 days a year, rent-free, to produce each season of the longest-running music series in American television history.

References

External links
 

Austin City Limits
Music venues completed in 2011
Music venues in Austin, Texas
Television studios in the United States
2011 establishments in Texas